Harcourt Street is a street located in Dublin City, Ireland.

Location 

The River Stein, an underground river, runs underneath the upper section of the street.

History 
The street first appears on maps in 1784, and is named after Simon Harcourt, 1st Earl Harcourt. 

Unionist politician Edward Carson was born at no. 4 and there is a plaque located at the house. John Scott, 1st Earl of Clonmell lived on the street  at no. 17 and Bram Stoker lived at no. 16 for a period.

No. 6 is a building with many historical connections including as headquarters of Arthur Griffith's Sinn Féin. It was donated by the state to Conradh na Gaeilge in 1966 on the fiftieth anniversary of the Easter Rising. This was to mark the contribution of Conradh na Gaeilge to the nationalist movement, six of the seven signatories of the 1916 Proclamation having been members of the Conradh. The building was the subject of a documentary Uimhir 6.

Architecture 
The street is a largely intact Georgian one. Harcourt Street station, the former railway station, is a prominent building on the street.

 the road is overlaid with a LUAS tram line and traffic is single direction only outwards from the intersection with Charlotte Way. There is a LUAS stop outside the old railway terminus towards the south end of the street. The street is known for its numerous bars and nightclubs, including Tripod and Copper Face Jacks.

See also
List of streets and squares in Dublin

References

Streets in Dublin (city)
St Stephen's Green